For the first time, two cities submitted bids to host the 1963 Pan American Games that were recognized by the Pan American Sports Organization (PASO). On August 25, 1959, São Paulo was selected over Winnipeg to host the IV Pan American Games by the PASO at the VII Pan American Sports Congress in Chicago, United States.

Host city selection 
Twenty-three countries took place in the vote; with a total of eighteen votes against five, the Brazilian city won the right to host the 1963 Pan-American Games.

Candidate cities

São Paulo, Brazil 
São Paulo had lost its bid to hold the 1959 Pan American Games to Chicago by a vote of 13 to 6 on August 3, 1957; because of this, many believed that São Paulo would receive overwhelming support to hold the 1963 Games. The Organizing and Executive Committee, headed by Sylvio de Magalhães Padilha, announced its intent to bid for the 1963 Games in 1958.

Winnipeg, Canada 
On February 8, 1958, Mayor of Winnipeg Stephen Juba announced that Winnipeg would be bidding for the Games, noting that the games have been moving further north with each edition, and Canada would be the next logical step. Juba and athlete Doug Groff made presented Winnipeg's bid along with their 12-man delegation.

After failing to secure their bid, Juba was convinced that "São Paulo was given some sort of assurance" that the Brazilian city would hold the 1957 Games. In the same manner, the PASO was on record stating that Canada was in serious contention to hold the 1967 Pan American Games—an event that Winnipeg ultimately hosted.

References

1963 Pan American Games
Bids for the Pan American Games